A total solar eclipse occurred on April 6, 1875. A solar eclipse occurs when the Moon passes between Earth and the Sun, thereby totally or partly obscuring the image of the Sun for a viewer on Earth. A total solar eclipse occurs when the Moon's apparent diameter is larger than the Sun's, blocking all direct sunlight, turning day into darkness. Totality occurs in a narrow path across Earth's surface, with the partial solar eclipse visible over a surrounding region thousands of kilometres wide.
Totality was visible on the southern tip of Africa, across the Indian ocean, and across southeastern Asia and Northern Philippines.

Observations 
Astronomers J. N. Lockyer and Arthur Schuster traveled to observe the eclipse and measure spectral lines to determine the elemental contents of the solar corona.

Related eclipses

Saros 127

Notes

References
 NASA graphic
 Googlemap
 NASA Besselian elements

1875 04 06
1875 in science
1875 04 06
April 1875 events